George Baker Burrough (8 February 1907 — 9 May 1965) was an English cricketer. He was a slow bowler who played for Somerset. He was born in Glastonbury and died in Butleigh.

Burrough made a single first-class appearance for Somerset during the 1936 season, against Cambridge University at Taunton, the first time Cambridge had played on that ground. Batting at No 11, Burrough scored 27 runs in the only innings in which he batted, and took one wicket, that of Norman Yardley, with the ball.

References

1907 births
1965 deaths
English cricketers
Somerset cricketers
People from Glastonbury